Lorraine Davidson is a British television and newspaper journalist. She has worked as an STV and BBC political correspondent, and for the Scottish Labour Party.

Career 
Davidson was STV's Westminster correspondent until she joined the BBC's political unit in 1997. In May 1998, she became Director of Communications for the Scottish Labour Party, under leader Donald Dewar, two weeks after Paul McKinney unexpectedly quit. She served until July 1999. She later wrote a biography of First Minister and Scottish Labour leader Jack McConnell.

She also worked at the Daily Mirror and, as of 2017, works for The Times.

Personal life 
She is a previous partner of then-South Lanarkshire council leader Tom McCabe, who later became a Member of the Scottish Parliament and junior minister. She is now wife of David Martin, former Member of the European Parliament for Scotland and co-convener of the Citizens' Assembly of Scotland since 2019.

References

Living people
People from Bearsden
STV News newsreaders and journalists
BBC newsreaders and journalists
Labour Party (UK) officials
Scottish Labour
The Times journalists
Scottish television journalists
Scottish political journalists
Scottish political commentators
Scottish public relations people
British women television journalists
Scottish women writers
Women biographers
1966 births
Scottish women radio presenters
Scottish women journalists